Starter for 10 is a 2006 British comedy-drama film directed by Tom Vaughan from a screenplay by David Nicholls, adapted from his 2003 novel Starter for Ten. The film stars James McAvoy as a university student who wins a place on a University Challenge quiz team. It premiered at the Toronto International Film Festival in September 2006, and was released in the UK and Ireland on 10 November 2006, and in Canada and the US on 23 February 2007.

Plot
In 1985, Brian Jackson is a first-year university student and information sponge. Since his working-class childhood in Southend-on-Sea, Brian has loved the TV quiz show University Challenge, with its catchphrase, "Your starter for 10...". Soon after arriving at Bristol University, Brian attends a party where he meets left-wing Rebecca, with whom he feels an instant connection. Brian attempts to join the University Challenge team, but narrowly fails to secure a place when he helps another candidate, Alice, cheat on the qualifying test.

Brian falls for the glamorous Alice and tries to date her, despite her signals that she sees him as a friend. As term starts, Brian is invited to join the team after a member falls ill. The captain, Patrick, is a stuck-up post-grad who has remained captain despite never having achieved success on University Challenge. Brian impresses the team with his trivia knowledge and uses his time to get closer to Alice, eventually getting invited to her house for Christmas.

Unfortunately, Brian embarrasses himself in front of her family by getting stoned while trying to impress Alice. He returns to Bristol for the rest of the vacation and meets Rebecca again. They again hit it off, but, as they are hooking up, he inadvertently calls her "Alice", offending her and ruining the moment. Following his romantic failures, he talks to Spencer, his friend from Southend, who admits to being in legal trouble. Brian invites Spencer to a party before his court appearance.

During the party, Patrick insults Spencer's upbringing and belittles him. Spencer hits Patrick in the face and disrupts the event. Afterwards, Brian shares a drink with Rebecca and tries to apologise for his own behaviour. However, Rebecca still feels Brian loves Alice and encourages him to follow his heart and tell Alice how he feels. He takes her advice and arrives at Alice's flat to declare his love, but discovers Spencer there. Excited by his violent behaviour at the party, Alice had invited him back. Brian feels betrayed by them both, since he had told Spencer how he felt about Alice.

Brian gets depressed and struggles with concentrating during University Challenge practices and his studies, threatening his university place. Patrick becomes frustrated with Brian, and as they arrive for their University Challenge match, berates him for his lack of focus. In response, Brian headbutts Patrick, but only succeeds in knocking himself unconscious. He is revived backstage by Rebecca, who has come to watch the show and gives him encouragement before he is escorted to the set.

On the way, Brian is briefly left alone with an open envelope containing the quiz questions. He reads one of the cards before putting it back in the envelope, and, inspired by the relative ease of a question about astronomy, rejoins his team. The match starts off poorly, with nerves clearly getting to Patrick as he fails to answer several questions and puts the team in a hole. Brian slowly but surely digs them out of it, getting into his swing as he answers question after question.

As the match is heating up and Brian's team has the momentum, quizmaster Bamber Gascoigne announces that the next question will be on astronomy and Brian inadvertently buzzes and gives the answer to the question he had previously seen before Gascoigne has even begun to read it.  Realising that Brian has seen the cards, Gascoigne suspends the match and Brian's team is disqualified.

Brian returns home and falls into another depression, sleeping all day and ignoring calls. His mother tries to get him out of the house, but the person who finally reaches him is Spencer. He tells Brian that his court case has gone better than expected, and that he is sorry for his behaviour and proud of Brian for chasing his dreams.

Inspired by his friend, Brian returns to Bristol and meets his tutor, promising he is back for good. He then stands Alice up to find Rebecca, who is taking part in a political demonstration. He asks her if she could ever forgive him for his mistakes, and if they can start again. She replies that he already knows the answer, and they kiss.

Cast

 James McAvoy as Brian Jackson
 Alice Eve as Alice Harbinson
 Rebecca Hall as Rebecca Epstein
 Dominic Cooper as Spencer
 James Corden as Tone
 Simon Woods as Josh
 Catherine Tate as Julie Jackson
 Elaine Tan as Lucy Chang
 Charles Dance as Michael Harbinson
 Lindsay Duncan as Rose Harbinson
 Benedict Cumberbatch as Patrick Watts
 Mark Gatiss as Bamber Gascoigne
 James Gaddas as Mr Jackson
 John Henshaw as Des
 Guy Henry as Dr Morrison
 Ben Willbond as University Challenge Producer

Production
Although set at Bristol University, the main quad and Gustave Tuck lecture theatre of University College London were used as sets. The University of Bristol Students Union building is in fact the university's School of Chemistry. The Granada TV studios are actually at the back of BBC Television Centre: the corridor (actually leading to the BBC multi-storey car park) was transformed for a day for the filming in 2005 with the addition of a Granada logo and pictures of past stars. The buildings at the end where a demonstration was held in which Brian tells Rebecca how much he likes her is the Queen Mary Court and King William Court at the University of Greenwich. Brian's home is shown as a slightly run-down seaside house, supposedly located in Westcliff-on-Sea. These scenes were actually filmed in the small village of Jaywick, near Clacton-on-Sea. Clacton Pier was used for the scenes set on the pier at Southend-on-Sea.

Reception
The film received positive reviews, with a 90% rating on Rotten Tomatoes based on 78 reviews; the site's consensus states: "Starter For 10 is a spirited coming-of-age tale that remains charming and witty even as it veers into darker territory. The unique setting of a quiz show makes the film wittier than your average romantic comedy."

Alice Eve later commented that there had been a "big debate" over whether the title of the film would be meaningful outside the UK, and that it "just didn't travel".

Soundtrack
The soundtrack features music from The Cure, The Smiths, The Psychedelic Furs, Buzzcocks, Yazoo, Motörhead, Echo & the Bunnymen, The Undertones, Tears for Fears, The Style Council and Kate Bush, among others.

References

External links
 
 
 
 
 
 Official soundtrack on Allmusic.com

2006 films
2000s coming-of-age comedy-drama films
British coming-of-age comedy-drama films
Films with screenplays by David Nicholls
Films set in Bristol
Films set in Essex
Films set in 1985
Films based on British novels
Films about quizzes and game shows
University Challenge
Playtone films
HBO Films films
BBC Film films
Films directed by Tom Vaughan (director)
Films produced by Tom Hanks
Films produced by Gary Goetzman
Films scored by Blake Neely
Picturehouse films
2006 directorial debut films
Films set in universities and colleges
2000s English-language films
2000s British films